Medialab Technology was a leading post-production company located in Paris, France.   The company was founded in 1991 by French master Alain Guillon. President and CEO Gerard Mital has run the company since 1993. It was known it the late-1990s for its motion capture animation. It filed for bankruptcy in the year of 2000.

Shows
Sophie's Misfortunes (1996–1997)
Stickin' Around (1996)
Donkey Kong Country (1996–1998)
The Toons From Planet Orange (Elvis scenes only) (1998)

Clients
Nelvana
NBC
Teletoon
Canal+
TF1
France 2
Nickelodeon

Team
Gerard Mital President and CEO
Chris Labonte Chief Director of Storyboard

External links
medialabtechno.com - official website

References

Film production companies of France
Mass media in Paris